Antirrhea philoctetes, the common brown morpho or northern antirrhea, is a butterfly of the family Nymphalidae. It was described by Carl Linnaeus in 1758. It is found in Costa Rica, Panama, Guatemala, Colombia, Venezuela, the Guianas, Peru, Brazil and Bolivia.

The larvae feed on Geonoma longivaginata.

Subspecies
Antirrhea philoctetes philoctetes
Antirrhea philoctetes avernus Hopffer, 1874 (Amazon, Guianas, Peru, Bolivia)
Antirrhea philoctetes casta Bates, 1865 (Guatemala)
Antirrhea philoctetes intermedia Salazar, Constantino & López, 1998 (Colombia, Peru)
Antirrhea philoctetes lindigii C. & R. Felder, 1862 (Colombia)
Antirrhea philoctetes murena Staudinger, [1886] (Brazil: Amazonas)
Antirrhea philoctetes philaretes C. & R. Felder, 1862 (Colombia)
Antirrhea philoctetes theodori Fruhstorfer, 1907 (Brazil: Amazonas)
Antirrhea philoctetes tomasia Butler, 1875 (Costa Rica, Panama)
Antirrhea philoctetes ulei Strand, 1912 (Venezuela)

References

Butterflies described in 1758
Morphinae
Fauna of Brazil
Nymphalidae of South America
Taxa named by Carl Linnaeus